Severe Tropical Cyclone Yasi was a powerful and destructive tropical cyclone that made landfall in northern Queensland, Australia in early 2011, causing major damage to the affected areas. Originating as a tropical low near Fiji on 26 January, the system intensified to tropical cyclone status during the evening of 30 January. Yasi deepened rapidly over the next 24 hours, and was classified as a Category 3 cyclone at about 5 PM AEST (07:00 UTC) on 31 January 2011. Late on 1 February, the cyclone strengthened to a Category 4 system; then, early on 2 February, the cyclone intensified into a Category 5 Severe Tropical Cyclone. The system had a well-defined eye and continued to track west-southwestward, maintaining a central pressure of 930 hPa (27 inHg) and a Dvorak intensity of T6.5 into the evening.

At about 12:00 AM AEST (14:00 UTC) on 3 February, Yasi crossed the Australian coastline as a Category 5 severe tropical cyclone near Mission Beach, with estimated maximum 3-second gusts of 285 km/h spanning an area from Ingham to Cairns. A record low pressure of 929 hPa (27.43 inHg) was measured as the eye passed over Tully. Due to the size of the system and its strong core, Yasi maintained cyclonic intensity farther inland than normal, finally dissipating into a tropical low near Mount Isa, at 10 PM on 3 February 2011, 22 hours after the storm first crossed the coast. The storm caused an estimated AU$3.5 billion (US$3.6 billion) in damage, making it the costliest tropical cyclone to hit Australia on record (not accounting for inflation; otherwise, Cyclone Tracy was costlier). Yasi was also indirectly responsible for the death of a 23-year-old man, who died from suffocation by generator exhaust fumes.

Tropical Cyclone Yasi was the biggest storm in Queensland's history, with more than 10,000 people moved from their homes. The storm passed between the two big cities of Cairns and Townsville which only suffered minor damage. Early estimates of damage put the cost at about AU$100 million. It did not cause as much damage as government expected, as it missed major cities. It did however destroy 30% of the houses in Tully. At least 75% of the banana crop was destroyed, and damage to the sugar cane farms was expected to cost about AU$500 million. Damage to power lines left 150,000 homes without electricity.

Meteorological history

 
Over a region of high sea surface temperatures and low to moderate wind shear, it was expected to intensify gradually as it moved southwest. Little development took place over the following two days, though it was classified as a tropical depression on 27 January. By 28 January, the depression was characterised as a poorly-developed low, with a broad area of rotating, flaring convection. Considerable development took place on the following day, prompting the Joint Typhoon Warning Center (JTWC) to issue a Tropical Cyclone Formation Alert. The storm's low-level circulation centre became increasingly defined and convective banding features were apparent along the northern periphery of the depression.

It deepened rapidly throughout 30 January, resulting in the JTWC upgrading the system to a tropical storm after data from an ASCAT image depicted winds near gale-force around the storm's centre. Shortly thereafter, the FMS also upgraded the storm, classifying it as Tropical Cyclone Yasi. Upon being classified a tropical cyclone, Yasi was located about 370 km (230 mi) northeast of Vanuatu. Along the north edge of a strong subtropical ridge, the storm tracked generally westward, taking it through the northern islands of the country. Continuing to rapidly intensify, Yasi attained severe tropical cyclone intensity with ten-minute sustained winds of at least 120 km/h (75 mph) on 31 January, as the primary convective band wrapped around the storm's centre. Later that day, the storm crossed 160°E, prompting the final advisory from the FMS and the first advisory from the Australian Bureau of Meteorology, as the system crossed into the Australian cyclone basin. 

Shortly after entering the BoM's area of responsibility, the storm initiated a period of rapid intensification under extremely favorable conditions as it turned southwestward, with a shallow eye developing by 31 January. As the storm continued to intensify, a well defined circular eye developed. The storm reached Category 4 intensity late on 1 February, and Category 5 status early on the next day. Meanwhile, the JTWC assessed the system to have reached Category 4-equivalent status on the Saffir–Simpson scale.

Traveling southwestwards, Yasi remained a powerful storm until its landfall near Mission Beach, Queensland, at 14:00 UTC on February 2. Upon making landfall, the storm rapidly weakened and was no longer a Severe Tropical cyclone 6 hours after landfall. For the next several days, the storm meandered as a depression over Australia, before dissipating on February 6.

Preparations, impact and aftermath

Severe Tropical Cyclone Yasi directly impacted the Solomon Islands, Vanuatu and parts of Australia, while parts of Fiji and Papua New Guniea were indirectly impacted. As a result of the system's impacts, the name Yasi was subsequently retired from the list of South Pacific tropical cyclone names and replaced with Yvone.

Fiji, Vanuatu, Papua New Guinea and the Solomon Islands
Between 23 and 30 January, strong winds and swells were observed in Tuvalu, as Tropical Cyclones Wilma and Yasi developed and passed. These strong winds delayed shipping schedules and affected students studying in Vaitupu and Fiji, and outer islands ran out of fresh supplies as a result of rough seas. During 28–30 January, Yasi's precursor tropical depression caused rain and strong winds over the Fijian islands off Rotuma, Vanua Levu, Taveuni and the northern Yasawa Islands.

During 30 January, Yasi became the second of three systems to directly impact Vanuatu in two months. Tropical Cyclone Yasi moved across Vanuatu's northern Torba Province, with winds reaching up to 95 km/h (60 mph). Vanuatuan officials reported difficulties making contact with the Torba Province, but it was believed that the northern area escaped major damage.

The storm was several hundred kilometres southeast of Papua New Guinea, but the outer edges of the large system brought strong winds, high seas and heavy rain to the country. In Milne Bay Province, local officials advised residents living along the coast to move to higher grounds.

Willis Island
As Yasi moved into the Australian region meteorological data from the weather station on Willis Island was used to help monitor the system. Ahead of the system impacting the island, staff battened down the buildings and were evacuated off the island by a helicopter during 1 February. After the system passed over the island, it became clear that the strong winds and storm surge had damaged the radar, key observing systems as well as communications, operational and life support infrastructure. It was also noted that the system had altered the shape of the island and cleared most of its vegetation. Most of the automated surface observing systems and communications were subsequently restored and became operational, fifteen days after Yasi had passed over the island. However, the radar and life-supporting systems took a bit longer to restore and were subsequently completed by the end of November, before staff returned to the island during December 2011.

Australia
By the time Yasi crossed into Australian basin, preparations for the storm were under way.  Media outlets referred to the storm as "what could be the state's worst cyclone in history".

Because of its great size, many feared that the tropical cyclone could cause damage more severe than Cyclone Larry in 2006 or Cyclone Tracy, which severely damaged Darwin in 1974. Thousands of residents in the path of the storm were urged to evacuate by Queensland Premier Anna Bligh. Thirty thousand people were evacuated from Cairns, including all patients from Cairns Base Hospital and Cairns Private Hospital who were airlifted by the Royal Australian Air Force and other agencies (such as the Royal Flying Doctor Service) to Brisbane. The Queensland state emergency coordinator warned residents that they would be on their own for up to 24 hours, as the conditions would be too dangerous for emergency responders.

Waves as high as 12 m (39.37 ft) were predicted to hit the north Queensland coast as the storm surge caused by Cyclone Yasi combined with a high tide of up to 7 m (23 ft) above average.

In Mission Beach near where Cyclone Yasi made landfall, wind gusts were estimated to have reached , leaving behind much damage. In the hours after the storm's passage, police could not venture beyond their station grounds as the situation had yet to be declared safe. Most of the beach had lost its sand and every structure was damaged to some degree. Near sunrise on 3 February, there were no reports of fatalities or injuries in Mission Beach. As the eye of the storm moved over several towns in Queensland, news reporters took the opportunity to give brief damage assessments before the eyewall returned. The worst affected areas were around Tully, Tully Heads, Silkwood, Mission Beach, Innisfail and Cardwell.

According to residents in Tully, the town was "...a scene of mass devastation". Many other homes not destroyed sustained severe facade and or roof damage. As daybreak came, reports from the town stated that about 90% of the structures along the main avenue sustained extensive damage.

An evacuation centre in Innisfail began to flood as the worst of Yasi's impacts neared. Evacuees were reportedly hammering boards at the bottom of doors to prevent water from further entering the structure. In Townsville, numerous roofs were torn off buildings and sent hurtling down streets. Many windows are believed to have been broken as residents reported the sound of glass breaking throughout the night as the storm moved through. In Tully, the high school was destroyed and will need to be rebuilt.

Numerous emergency calls were made by residents trapped in their homes near the height of the storm. However, their calls could not be acted upon as conditions were too dangerous for police to travel in. One reported instance was of six people trapped in an apartment complex at Port Hinchinbrook near Cardwell, who could not be evacuated. The building was threatened by Yasi's storm surge which exceeded . The group were later reported to be safe. Around 10:30 pm local time on 2 February, Premier Bligh stated that an estimated 90,000 structures, including evacuation centres, were without power. This figure rose to 170,000 by morning and officials stated that some residents may be without power for more than a month.

The water-supply system had failed in Townsville and there was only 24 hours supply, while the water had run out at Magnetic Island in one day.

Fears of total devastation to the banana and sugar cane crops arose as the storm struck land. Initial estimates stated that damage to sugar cane alone could reach A$505 million. On 3 February, total losses from the storm were estimated to reach A$3.5 billion (US$3.54 billion), this makes it the costliest cyclone to ever hit Australia (not accounting for inflation). By 5 February, A$2 billion (US$2.03 billion) was confirmed to have been lost in agriculture, mining and local government. An additional A$1 billion has been lost in the tourism industry.

One death was due to carbon monoxide poisoning by exhaust of a portable generator being used in a confined space at Bambaroo near Ingham.

Two days after landfall, severe flooding from the rains severed the Bruce Highway between Townsville and Ingham leaving a 10 kilometre backup of traffic. Many of those who evacuated the devastated areas including emergency workers were stranded.

Flooding was widespread in towns of northern South Australia reaching even Renmark on the River Murray.

The deluge also continued in northern South Australia as vast areas continued to get rain. Damaging winds with gusts of more than 90 km/h hit Marla and Coober Pedy.

Even one week after the flooding rains, areas that were affected had become completely isolated. At Challenger Gold Mine 150 people were isolated and emergency supplies had to be flown in. Cattle Stations near Oodnadatta, Glendambo and the world's largest at Anna Creek Station were all isolated.

The Australian Defence Force (ADF) response was designated Operation Yasi Assist. The ADF established Joint Task Force 664, based at Lavarack Barracks in Townsville and under the command of Brigadier Stuart Smith, for operational command on 2 February 2011.

See also

2010–11 Australian region cyclone season
Timeline of the 2010–11 Australian region cyclone season
2010–11 Queensland floods
March 2010 Queensland floods
Cyclone Althea
Cyclone Tasha
Cyclone Larry
Cyclone Oswald
Cyclone Ita
Cyclone Tracy

References

External links

 Australian Bureau of Meteorology (TCWC's Perth, Darwin & Brisbane) 
 Joint Typhoon Warning Center (JTWC) 
 Tropical Cyclone Yasi at NASA Earth Observatory
 ABC News- Tropical Cyclones explained
 Tropical Cyclone Yasi (Feb 2011) – snapshots of relevant webpages from 2011
 Queensland Floods and Cyclone Yasi footage 2011, State Library of Queensland
 Queensland cyclone photographs, State Library of Queensland. Includes photographs of the aftermath of Cyclone Yasi.

Category 5 Australian region cyclones
Tropical cyclones in Queensland
Cyclone Yasi
2011 in Vanuatu
2011 in the Solomon Islands
Tropical cyclones in Vanuatu
Tropical cyclones in the Solomon Islands
Disasters in Queensland
2010–11 Australian region cyclone season
2010–11 South Pacific cyclone season
Retired South Pacific cyclones
Yasi